is a Japanese chemical engineering and manufacturing company headquartered in Anan, Japan with global subsidiaries. It specializes in the manufacturing and distribution of phosphors, including light-emitting diodes (LEDs), laser diodes, battery materials, and calcium chloride.

The Nichia Corporation comprises two divisions — Division 1, responsible for phosphors and other chemicals, and Division 2, responsible for LEDs. In the field of phosphors the company has 50% of the Japanese market and 25% of the world market.

Nichia is the world’s largest supplier of LEDs. It designs, manufactures, and markets LEDs for display, LCD backlighting, automotive and general lighting applications with the many different leds across the entire visible spectrum. Nichia’s invention and development of white LEDs have spanned several accomplishments throughout the history of the company.

History
The Nichia Corporation was founded in 1956 by Nobuo Ogawa (小川 信雄, 1912-2002) at Aratano-cho, Anan, Tokushima to produce calcium phosphate for fluorescent lamp phosphors. The majority ownership is still held by the Ogawa family today.

In 1966, Nichia began production of phosphors for fluorescent lamps. In 1971, Nichia began production of phosphors for color TVs. In 1977, Nichia began the production of tri-color phosphors for fluorescent lamps.

One of Nobuo Ogawa's more well-known decisions was to support Shuji Nakamura to do research on gallium nitride light-emitting diodes, when it was generally considered a very risky business. The research turned out to be a great success; however, the company received scrutiny for the small size of the ¥20,000 (US$180) bonus initially awarded to Nakamura for his 1993 invention of the first high brightness blue-light LED, which was based on gallium nitride. Nichia later settled out of court with Nakamura for ¥840 million (US$7 million), in what was then the highest bonus ever awarded by a Japanese company.

Nichia supports financially a Polish company Ammono, which is the current (as of 2011) world leader in bulk Gallium Nitride (GaN) manufacturing of 2-inch diameter high quality bulk c-plane GaN substrates as well as non-polar M-plane, A-plane and semi-polar GaN wafer. Nichia funds a joint research project with Ammono to develop ammonothermal gallium nitride growth, and in return Nichia took a stake in Ammono’s intellectual property, as well as access to the crystals that were made.

Several of Nichia's innovations have won awards, such as the Nikkei Best Products Award.

Major competitors
Nichia Corporation's competitors include Seoul Semiconductor, Cree, Everlight Electronics, Lumileds, Epistar and Osram.

Litigation
In January 2006, Nichia launched a lawsuit against rival LED manufacturer Seoul Semiconductor Co., Ltd., alleging design patent infringement. Nichia and Seoul Semiconductor announced that they have settled all litigation on patent and other issues as well as other legal disputes currently pending between them in the United States, Germany, Japan, United Kingdom, and Korea. The settlement includes a cross license agreement covering LED and laser diode technologies, which will permit the companies to access all of each other's patented technologies. In accordance with the settlement terms, all litigations are to be terminated by mutual withdrawal, with the exception of litigation in Germany involving patent DE 691-07-630 T2 of EP 0-437-385 B1, which was resolved following a February 2009 hearing.

References

External links 

 
 Millennium Prize - Top prize for 'light' inventor

Chemical companies of Japan
Electronics companies of Japan
Light-emitting diode manufacturers
Companies based in Tokushima Prefecture
Chemical companies established in 1956
Japanese brands
Electronics companies established in 1956
Japanese companies established in 1956